Letang may refer to:

Geography
Letang Municipality, Province No. 1,  Nepal
Letang, New Brunswick, Canada

People
Alan Letang, OHL coach and former NHL player
Doreen Ann Letang, plaintiff of the British case Letang v Cooper
Kris Letang, Canadian NHL player
Petra Letang, British actress